This is a list of the heads of the diplomatic representatives of Romania to the United States. Italics indicate ad-interim representatives.

Legation
Constantin Angelescu, January 15, 1918
Nicolae Henrik Lahovary, March 16, 1918
Antoine Bibesco, February 25, 1921
Frederick Nano, February 24, 1926
Radu T. Djuvara, April 9, 1926
George Cretziano, November 15, 1926
Charles A. Davila, October 15, 1929
Mircea Victor Babeș, February 1, 1938
Radu Irimescu, April 11, 1938 / April 21, 1938
Brutus Coste, October 15, 1940
Vasile Stoica May 27, 1941

December 12, 1941 - September 20, 1946 - State of war

Mihai Ralea, appointed September 20, 1946; October 1, 1946
Mihai Magheru, appointed September 21, 1949; September 26, 1949
Marin Florea Ionescu, appointed April 15, 1953; May 4, 1953
Anton Moisescu, appointed November 26, 1954; December 7, 1954
Silviu Brucan, appointed April 9, 1956; April 30, 1956
George Macovescu, appointed August 12, 1959; August 21, 1959
Petre Bălăceanu, December 12, 1961

Embassy

Petre Bălăceanu, appointed July 27, 1964; August 14, 1964
Corneliu Bogdan, appointed July 19, 1967; July 27, 1967
Gheorghe Ioniță, appointed June 3, 1976
Nicolae M. Nicolae, appointed June 18, 1976; July 9, 1976
Ion Beșteliu, August 11, 1978
Nicolae Ionescu, appointed October 3, 1978; November 16, 1978
Eugen Popa, March 24, 1982
Mircea Malița, appointed April 30, 1982; June 25, 1982
Nicolae Gavrilescu, appointed April 9, 1985; May 22, 1985
Ion Stoichici, appointed September 28, 1987; October 20, 1987
Virgil Constantinescu, appointed February 13, 1990; April 9, 1990
Aurel-Dragoș Munteanu, appointed April 6, 1992; May 5, 1992
Mihai Horia Botez, appointed September 20, 1994; November 21, 1994
Mircea Dan Geoană, appointed February 1, 1996; February 6, 1996
Sorin Dumitru Ducaru, appointed May 25, 2001; June 20, 2001
Adrian Cosmin Vierița, appointed January 2, 2008; January 22, 2008
Iulian Buga, appointed November 19, 2013; December 3, 2013
George Cristian Maior, appointed September 1, 2015; September 17, 2015
Andrei Muraru, appointed July 7, 2021

See also
 Embassy of Romania, Washington, D.C.

References

Chief of Protocol United States Department of State, Diplomatic Representation for Romania

 
United States
Romania